Bahía Drake (Drake Bay) is a small bay on the north side of the Osa Peninsula on the coast of southwestern Costa Rica.

This bay is believed to be a port used by Sir Francis Drake during his raids on the Spanish Main in the 16th century and the location of one of the British pirate's fabled hidden treasures.

The main town of Bahía Drake is Agujitas and has a population of about 1,000 residents. The bay is off the beaten track and can be reached by plane, boat, and car (ideally a 4x4 vehicle) during the dry season. Because of lack of bridges, driving to Bahía Drake is challenging and not recommended for visitors. There are many kilometers of unpaved road and multiple river crossings required to reach Drake Bay. There are kilometers of natural coastline with rocky crags and sandy coves that extend from Agujitas, where the village of Bahía Drake is located southward toward the boundary of Corcovado National Park about 20 kilometers to the south. Most of the eco lodges are located along the beach. The town of Bahía Drake has a public medical clinic opened during week days, except for national holidays; and a private medical center opened 24/7 for emergencies, a school, a few grocery stores, a gift shop, and several restaurants and bars.

The main feature of Bahia Drake is Corcovado National Park hiking and Caño Island snorkeling/diving. Corcovado National Park occupies about a third of the peninsula. The preservation of forest and wildlife in the area has been made a priority by the Costa Rican government through the efforts of MINAE.

Bahía Drake has been accessible only by sea until recently and so it remains mainly a low-land tropical rainforest. Since about 1990, eco-tourism has been the principal economy of the area including sport fishing

Climate
Bahía Drake has a tropical rainforest climate (Af) with significant seasonal variation. February, the driest month receives about 65 mm of rain while October, the wettest month receives about 803 mm. The following climate data is for the town of Agujitas.

References

External links

14 Of The Best Drake Bay Tours
 How To Get To Drake Bay in Costa Rica - All bus, speedboats schedules and the best tips to reach the region.
Gallery
Drake's Bay Sportfishing Sportfishing Costa Rica
How to get to Drake Bay Information about Drake Bay transportation
Drake Bay Medical Center Private Medical Services

Bays of Costa Rica
Geography of Puntarenas Province